The 1876 Donegal by-election was fought on 26 August 1876.  The byelection was fought due to the death of the incumbent Conservative MP, Thomas Conolly.  It was won by the Conservative candidate William Wilson, who beat the Liberal candidate, Thomas Lea, former member for Kidderminster, by 1,975 votes to 1876, a majority of 99.

References

1876 elections in the United Kingdom
By-elections to the Parliament of the United Kingdom in County Donegal constituencies
1876 elections in Ireland